The 1990 United States House of Representatives elections in Texas occurred on November 6, 1990, to elect the members of the state of Texas's delegation to the United States House of Representatives. Texas had twenty-seven seats in the House, apportioned according to the 1980 United States Census.

These elections occurred simultaneously with the United States Senate elections of 1990, the United States House elections in other states, and various state and local elections.

Overview

Congressional Districts

District 1 
Incumbent Democrat Jim Chapman ran for re-election.

District 2 
Incumbent Democrat Charlie Wilson ran for re-election.

District 3 
Incumbent Republican Steve Bartlett ran for re-election.

District 4 
Incumbent Democrat Ralph Hall ran for re-election.

District 5 
Incumbent Democrat John Wiley Bryant ran for re-election.

District 6 
Incumbent Republican Joe Barton ran for re-election.

District 7 
Incumbent Republican Bill Archer ran for re-election unopposed.

District 8 
Incumbent Republican Jack Fields ran for re-election unopposed.

District 9 
Incumbent Democrat Jack Brooks ran for re-election.

District 10 
Incumbent Democrat J. J. Pickle ran for re-election.

District 11 
Incumbent Democrat Marvin Leath opted to retire rather than run for re-election.

District 12 
Incumbent Democratic Speaker of the United States House of Representatives Jim Wright resigned on June 6, 1989 amid an ethics investigation. This prompted a special election to be held, which fellow Democrat Pete Geren won in a runoff. He ran for re-election.

District 13 
Incumbent Democrat Bill Sarpalius ran for re-election.

District 14 
Incumbent Democrat Greg Laughlin ran for re-election.

District 15 
Incumbent Democrat Kika de la Garza ran for re-election unopposed.

District 16 
Incumbent Democrat Ronald D. Coleman ran for re-election.

District 17 
Incumbent Democrat Charles Stenholm ran for re-election unopposed.

District 18 
Incumbent Democrat Mickey Leland died in a plane crash on August 7, 1989 en route to Fugnido, Ethiopia. This prompted a special election to be held, which fellow Democrat Craig Washington won in a runoff. He ran for re-election.

District 19 
Incumbent Republican Larry Combest ran for re-election unopposed.

District 20 
Incumbent Democrat Henry B. González ran for re-election unopposed.

District 21 
Incumbent Republican Lamar Smith ran for re-election.

District 22 
Incumbent Republican Tom DeLay ran for re-election.

District 23 
Incumbent Democrat Albert Bustamante ran for re-election.

District 24 
Incumbent Democrat Martin Frost ran for re-election unopposed.

District 25 
Incumbent Democrat Michael A. Andrews ran for re-election unopposed.

District 26 
Incumbent Republican Dick Armey ran for re-election.

District 27 
Incumbent Democrat Solomon Ortiz ran for re-election unopposed.

References

1990
Texas
1990 Texas elections